Ophichthus obtusus is an eel in the family Ophichthidae (worm/snake eels). It was described by John E. McCosker, S. Ide, and Hiromitsu Endo in 2012.

References

obtusus
Taxa named by John E. McCosker
Taxa named by Sachiko Ide
Taxa named by Hiromitsu Endo
Fish described in 2012